Connecticut Whale may refer to:

Connecticut Whale (PHF), a women's ice hockey team
Connecticut Whale (AHL), a former name of the Hartford Wolf Pack men's ice hockey team